The 2019–20 Basketball Champions League playoffs will begin on 3 March, and will end on 3 May, with the Final, which will decide the champions of the 2019–20 Basketball Champions League. 16 teams compete in the play-offs.

Format
The playoffs involved the sixteen teams which qualified between the four first teams of each of the four groups in the 2019–20 Basketball Champions League Regular season.

The group winners will face the fourth qualified teams and the runners-up will play against the third qualified teams. Winners and runners-up will play the second leg at home. In addition, the winners of the matches involving the group winners will play also the first match and the third, if necessary, of the quarterfinals at home.

Each tie in the playoffs, apart from the Final Four games, will be played with best-of-three playoff format, with the seeded team playing matches 1 and 3 if necessary at home.

For the round of 16, teams from the same group cannot be drawn against each other.

Due to the coronavirus pandemic the format was changed and a Final Eight replaced the quarterfinals.

Qualified teams

Bracket

Round of 16

|}

First leg

Second leg

Third leg

Final Eight

References

External links
Basketball Champions League (official website)

2019–20 Basketball Champions League
Basketball Champions League playoffs